Sabapathy Dekshinamurthy, also known and credited as S. D. Saba,  and Saba Kailash, is an Indian film director, mainly working in the Tamil film industry.

Career
Sabapathy Dekshinamurthy started his career after completing his DFT in M.G.R. Government Film and Television Training Institute, formerly known as the Adyar Film Institute and started his career in 1992 with Bharathan. Bharathan was the first Tamil film to become a blockbuster that ran for 100 days in Kerala. After that he went on to direct hit films Sundara Purushan, V.I.P., Punnagai Poove and the critically acclaimed Naam. Sundara Purushan was remade in Telugu as Andala Ramudu in 2006.

In 2001, he began making a film titled Irandu Paer starring Ramki, Roja, Khushbu and Sanghavi. The film however did not release.

Dekshinamurthy briefly worked on the production of a family drama film titled Maa during 2009, featuring Prithviraj, Srikanth, Bhumika Chawla and Madhu Shalini. Despite having a photoshoot and a first schedule in Rameswaram, the film ran into financial difficulties and was later shelved.

Filmography

References

External links
 

Tamil film directors
Living people
20th-century Indian film directors
21st-century Indian film directors
1970 births